Marco Anghileri (born 11 April 1991) is an Italian professional footballer who plays as a right back for  club A.C. Renate.

Club career
Born in Valmadrera, Anghileri made his professional debut for Monza in 2009–10 Lega Pro season. He spent six seasons at the club, and in March 2014 played his 100th match for Monza.

In 2015, after a Monza club economic crisis, Anghileri signed with AlbinoLeffe.

In July 2015, Anghileri joined Serie C club Renate, where was named captain of the team. On 15 May 2021, he extended his contract with the club until 2023. In December 2022, he signed another new deal with Renate, committing to stay until June 2024.

Personal life
In June 2021, he married Barbara Colombo.

References

External links
 
 

1991 births
Living people
Sportspeople from the Province of Lecco
Footballers from Lombardy
Italian footballers
Association football fullbacks
Serie C players
A.C. Monza players
U.C. AlbinoLeffe players
A.C. Renate players